Clare railway station was a station that served the village of Clare in Suffolk, England.

The station and line closed in 1967 as part of the Beeching cuts.

The platforms, station building, waiting room and a goods shed are within the Clare Castle Country Park.

References

External links
 Clare station on navigable 1946 O. S. map
 

Disused railway stations in Suffolk
Former Great Eastern Railway stations
Railway stations in Great Britain opened in 1865
Railway stations in Great Britain closed in 1967
Beeching closures in England
Clare, Suffolk